Horace Wilder (August 20, 1802 – December 26, 1889) was a Republican politician in the U.S. State of Ohio who was in the Ohio House of Representatives and was an Ohio Supreme Court Judge 1863-1865.

Horace Wilder was born at West Hartland, Connecticut, and graduated from Yale University in 1823. He moved to Virginia, where he taught school, and was admitted to the bar January, 1826. He returned to Connecticut, then moved to Ohio in 1827. He settled in Ashtabula in 1828, where he was admitted to the Ohio bar.

In 1833, Wilder was elected Prosecuting Attorney of Ashtabula County. He represented Ashtabula County in the Ohio House of Representatives in the 33rd General Assembly, (December, 1834–June, 1835).

In 1855, Wilder was elected Common Pleas Judge for a seven-year term. In 1863, he was appointed by Governor Tod to the Ohio Supreme Court to fill the vacancy from resigned Gholson. The next year he was elected to fill the remainder of Gholson's term, but was not nominated for re-election. He resumed private practice in Ashtabula, and moved to Red Wing, Minnesota, in May, 1867, where he died December 26, 1889. He was buried next to his wife in the cemetery in Conneaut, Ohio.

Wilder was married March 27, 1833 to Phoebe Jerusha Coleman in Ashtabula. They had five children.

See also
List of justices of the Ohio Supreme Court

Notes

References

Ohio lawyers
Republican Party members of the Ohio House of Representatives
Justices of the Ohio Supreme Court
Politicians from Ashtabula, Ohio
Yale University alumni
1802 births
1889 deaths
People from Red Wing, Minnesota
County district attorneys in Ohio
People from Hartland, Connecticut
19th-century American politicians
19th-century American judges
19th-century American lawyers